Qareh Golul, also known as Garagua, may refer to:
 Qareh Gol-e Olya
 Qareh Gol-e Sofla